Malaysia competed in the 1999 Southeast Asian Games held in Bandar Seri Begawan, Brunei from 7 to 15 August 1999.

Medal summary

Medals by sport

Medallists

Football

Men's tournament
Group B

References

1999
Nations at the 1999 Southeast Asian Games